The 1974 Louisville Open, also known as the First National Tennis Classic, was a men's tennis tournament played on outdoor clay courts at the Louisville Tennis Center in Louisville, Kentucky, USA. It was the fifth edition of the tournament and was held from 29 July through 5 August 1974. The tournament was part of the Grand Prix tennis circuit and categorized in Group AA. The singles final was won by tenth-seeded Guillermo Vilas who received the $16,000 first prize money and 80 Grand Prix points.

Finals

singles
 Guillermo Vilas defeated  Jaime Fillol 6–4, 7–5
 It was Vilas' fourth singles title of the year and the sixth singles title of his career

doubles
 Charlie Pasarell /  Erik van Dillen defeated  Jürgen Fassbender /  Hans-Jürgen Pohmann 6–2, 6–3

References

External links
ITF tournament details

Louisville Open
Louisville Open
Louisville Open
1974 in American tennis